I Killed My Mother is a 2009 Canadian drama film written, directed, produced by and starring Xavier Dolan, in his directorial debut. Loosely autobiographical, it follows the complicated relationship between a young man Hubert Minel (Dolan) and his mother (Anne Dorval). The film attracted international press attention when it won three awards from the Director's Fortnight program at the 2009 Cannes Film Festival. After being shown, the film received a standing ovation. It was shown in 12 cinemas in Quebec and 60 in France.

Plot
The film begins with Hubert Minel giving a black-and-white monologue explaining how he loves his mother but cannot stand being her son; he also reveals that when he was younger, things were better between them.

Hubert is a 16-year-old Québécois living in suburban Montreal with his single mother, Chantale, who divorced Hubert's father, Richard, when Hubert was much younger. Hubert barely sees his father, and this adds to the animosity between mother and son. One morning, as his mother drives him to school, Hubert starts an argument with her about her applying makeup while driving. The argument ends when Chantale stops the car and tells him to walk to school. At school Hubert claims to his teacher, Ms Cloutier, that his mother is dead. After the teacher finds out that it is a lie, she expresses this lie as "you killed your mother." This inspires Hubert to write an essay for school titled "I killed my mother."

Later in the film, Hubert expresses to his mother that he wants to live in his own apartment. At first, his mother seems to agree, but the next day she has changed her mind and does not allow it, claiming that she thinks he is too young. Hubert's friend Antonin is revealed to be his boyfriend, but Hubert has not told his mother, and she finds out from Antonin's mother, who assumed that Chantale already knew. Chantale, to some extent, accepts her son's homosexuality; however, she appears hurt that he did not tell her. 

The relationship between mother and son continues to deteriorate, and Hubert goes to live with his teacher, pretending to be staying with his boyfriend. Hubert's father invites him over for a visit; however, once there, Richard and Chantale tell Hubert they've decided to send him to a boarding school in Coaticook. Hubert is deeply angered that his father makes the decision, since Hubert only sees his father at Christmas and Easter.

At the Catholic boarding school, Hubert meets Eric, with whom he cheats on Antonin. Eric invites Hubert to go to a nightclub with the other students, where they kiss and Hubert takes speed. He takes the Metro home, wakes his mother, and has an emotional conversation with her. The next morning, she takes Hubert to Antonin's mother's workplace to help drip the walls in paint. He and Antonin finish, and he lays down. Antonin proceeds to lay on top of him and kiss him, and they end up having sex. Hubert, later at home, finds out that his mother has enrolled him for another year at the boarding school. Because of this, Hubert trashes his mother's bedroom, but soon after, he calms down and cleans it up. The two fight, and Chantale sends Hubert to Antonin's house, from which he returns to school the next day.

Back at school, Hubert is beaten by two fellow students. This causes Hubert to run away from school. The school's principal calls Chantale to inform her of the developments, revealing the note Hubert left, saying he will be "In his kingdom".  Chantale knows exactly where Hubert's "kingdom" is; the house he lived in as a child with both his parents. The principal also begins to lecture Chantale, which causes her to have an angry outburst at him, saying how he thinks he's better than her and how he has no right to judge a single mother, since he's a privilege white man. Hubert runs away with the help of Antonin, who has borrowed his mother's car. On the journey, Antonin tells Hubert that he is selfish and only cares about himself, but adds that he loves him.

Indeed, she finds Hubert and Antonin there. Chantale sits next to Hubert overlooking the beach. The film ends with a home video clip of Hubert as a child playing with his mother.

Cast

Production

Xavier Dolan wrote the script when he was 16 years old. He said in an interview with Canadian newspaper Le Soleil that the film was partly autobiographical.

The film was at first financed by Dolan, but when need for more money arose, he asked both Téléfilm and the SODEC for subsidies. Both turned him down for different reasons. SODEC, who had loved the project but refused to finance it because it was submitted to a too commercial department, encouraged Dolan to submit it again in the more appropriate "indie" department, which he did.

In December 2008, SODEC gave him a $400,000 subsidy. In all, the film cost around $800,000 CAD. Dolan said that the system to acquire funding is "[...] an obsolete financing mechanism that holds the creative assets of Quebec hostage."

Reception

Critical reception
The film received generally positive reviews from critics; review aggregator Rotten Tomatoes reports an approval rating of 83%, with an average rating of 7.03/10 based on 23 reviews. Peter Howell from the Toronto Star said that "What makes it extraordinary is its depth of feeling, which Dolan's age makes all the more impressive: he was just 19 when he made this."

Peter Brunette from The Hollywood Reporter called it "Uneven but funny and audacious adolescent comedy from a talented beginner."

Accolades
On 22 September 2009, Telefilm announced the film had been selected as Canada's submission for Best Foreign Language film at the 82nd Academy Awards. Despite this, it received no nominations at the 30th Genie Awards and received only the Claude Jutra Award for best directorial debut. Kevin Tierney, vice-chairman of cinema for the Academy of Canadian Cinema and Television, criticized the overlook, comparing it to "being sent to the kiddie table".

References

External links
 
  
 

2009 films
2009 drama films
Canadian LGBT-related films
2000s French-language films
Films directed by Xavier Dolan
Best First Feature Genie and Canadian Screen Award-winning films
Canadian coming-of-age drama films
Films set in Montreal
Films shot in Montreal
Gay-related films
Canadian independent films
2009 independent films
LGBT-related drama films
2009 LGBT-related films
LGBT-related coming-of-age films
Best French-Language Film Lumières Award winners
2009 directorial debut films
Films about mother–son relationships
Best Film Prix Iris winners
French-language Canadian films
2000s Canadian films